Lancaster is one of the smallest communities in the city of St. Catharines, Ontario, Canada. It borders Regional Road 83 and Grantham Township to the north, Garden City Skyway and Fitzgerald to the south, and Regional Road 48 and Facer to the east.

Neighbourhoods in St. Catharines